QF may stand for:

 Qantas, an airline of Australia (IATA code QF)
 Qatar Foundation, a private, chartered, non-profit organization in the state of Qatar
 Q-Fire, a decoy fire site used in World War II
 Quality factor, in physics and engineering, a measure of the "quality" of a resonant system 
 Quick-firing gun, a sort of artillery piece
 Quiverfull, a movement of Christians who eschew all forms of birth control
 A gun breech that uses metallic cartridges (see British ordnance terms#QF) 
 Quds Force an expeditionary warfare unit of IRGC

fr:QF